Prévessin-Moëns is a commune in the Ain department in eastern France, in the region of Auvergne-Rhône-Alpes.

The residents of Prévessin-Moëns are known as Prévessinois or Prévessinoises (feminine).

Geography 
The commune of Prévessin-Moëns is situated between the Jura mountains and the Alps, with a view of Mont Blanc. Originally founded as a combination of the communes of Prévessin and Moëns, the commune now also includes the hamlets of Magny, les Aglands, Brétigny, and Vésegnin. Founded as an agricultural commune, Prévessin-Moëns has transformed into a low-rise housing community populated mostly by "frontalier(e)s" who work across the Swiss border in the canton of Geneva. The town enjoys a temperate climate.

Education
The preschools-primary schools serving the community are École des Grands Chênes, École de la Bretonnière, École ALICE, and the intercommunal École Jean de la Fontaine (operated by SIVOM de l'Est Gessien of Ferney-Voltaire). Respectively, circa 2018, they had 340, 320, 280, and 85 students from Prévessin-Moëns commune.

Collège Le Joran (junior high school) is located in Prévessin-Moëns, while Lycée international de Ferney-Voltaire (having junior high school and senior high school/sixth form college) is in nearby Ferney-Voltaire.  Le Joran had about 500 students.

Population

See also
Communes of the Ain department

References
Prévessin-Moëns 

Communes of Ain
Ain communes articles needing translation from French Wikipedia